Thomas Oswald Wonnacott (22 July 1869 – 7 December 1957) was Archdeacon of Suffolk from 1938 to 1947.

Wonnacott was born in Liskeard, educated at King's College, Cambridge and ordained in 1893. He served curacies at Winchcombe, Ivybridge and Tavistock; and held incumbencies at Lanteglos, Great Bricet, Little Finborough and Stonham Aspal.

References

1869 births
1957 deaths
Alumni of King's College, Cambridge
Archdeacons of Suffolk